A  is a type of Japanese festival, or matsuri, in which participants wear a minimum amount of clothing; usually just a fundoshi loincloth, sometimes with a short happi coat, and rarely completely naked.

Naked festivals are held in dozens of places throughout Japan every year, usually in the summer or winter.

Konomiya

One of the biggest and oldest festivals is the Owari Ōkunitama Shrine Hadaka Matsuri held in Inazawa, where the festival originated over 1300 years ago. Every year, men participate in this festival in hopes of gaining luck for the entire year. The most famous part of the festival is when the "shin-otoko" (神男) enter the stage and has to find a way back to the shrine, called "naoiden". The participating men must try and touch the "shin-otoko" to transfer their bad luck to the "shin-otoko". During the night time ceremony, all the bad luck is transferred in a charcoal coloured giant mochi. The black mochi is made with rice mixed with the ashes of the burned Omamori from last year. The mochi is then buried in a secret location in the nearby forest. 

The men participating only wear a fundoshi and tabi.

Saidaiji

The most famous festival is the Saidai-ji Eyo Hadaka Matsuri held in Okayama, where the festival originated over 500 years ago. Every year, over 9,000 men participate in this festival in hopes of gaining luck for the entire year.

See also

Fundoshi
Go Topless Day
Tamotsu Yatō

References

Festivals in Japan
Shinto festivals
Cultural festivals in Japan
Japanese culture
Okayama
Sexuality in Shinto